Greensboro Historic District may refer to:

Greensboro Historic District (Greensboro, Alabama)
Greensboro Historic District (Greensboro, Pennsylvania)